Pawnee Township is located in Sangamon County, Illinois, United States. As of the 2010 census, its population was 3,058 and it contained 1,275 housing units.

Geography

Demographics

References

External links
City-data.com
Illinois State Archives

Townships in Sangamon County, Illinois
Springfield metropolitan area, Illinois
Townships in Illinois